The  Karl-Scheel-Preis  (Karl Scheel Prize) is an award given annually by the Physikalische Gesellschaft zu Berlin (PGzB, Physical Society of Berlin), a regional association of the Deutsche Physikalische Gesellschaft (German Physical Society), for outstanding scientific work. The prize was established through an endowment by the German physicist Karl Scheel (1866 – 1936) and his wife Melida. Recipients are awarded with the Karl-Scheel Medal (Karl-Scheel Medaille) and 5.000 Euros. The Karl-Scheel Medal in bronze was designed by the German sculptor Richard Scheibe and has a diameter of 12 cm.

List of recipients 
Names of recipients as stated on the official website of the PGzB. Affiliations refer to the institution of the recipient at the time of the award ceremony.

 2022: Björn Globisch (Technische Universität Berlin; Fraunhofer Institut für Telekommunikation, Heinrich-Hertz-Institut)
 2021: Es wurde kein Karl-Scheel-Preis vergeben
 2020: Tobias Heindel (Technische Universität Berlin)
 2019: Steve Albrecht (Helmholtz-Zentrum Berlin für Materialien und Energie)
 2018: Daniela Rupp (Max-Born-Institut für Nichtlineare Optik und Kurzzeitspektroskopie Berlin)
 2017: Aljaž Godec (Universität Potsdam) und Ricarda Winkelmann (Potsdam-Institut für Klimafolgenforschung)
 2016: Pierre Corfdir (Paul-Drude-Institut für Festkörperelektronik Berlin)
 2015: Es wurde kein Karl-Scheel-Preis vergeben
 2014: Tobias Kampfrath (Fritz-Haber-Institut der Max-Planck-Gesellschaft Berlin)
 2013: Ermin Malić (Technische Universität Berlin)
 2012: Kathy Lüdge (Technische Universität Berlin)
 2011: Der Karl-Scheel-Preis 2011 wurde aberkannt
 2010: Olga Smirnova (Max-Born-Institut für Nichtlineare Optik und Kurzzeitspektroskopie Berlin)
 2009: Katharina Franke (Freie Universität Berlin)
 2008: Norbert Koch (Humboldt-Universität zu Berlin)
 2007: Uwe Bovensiepen (Freie Universität Berlin)
 2006: Es wurde kein Karl-Scheel-Preis vergeben
 2005: Stephanie Reich (Technische Universität Berlin)
 2004: Markus Abel (Universität Potsdam)
 2003: Francesca Moresco (Freie Universität Berlin)
 2002: Erich Runge (Humboldt-Universität zu Berlin)
 2001: Roland P. Netz (Max-Planck-Institut für Kolloid - und Grenzflächenforschung (Golm))
 2000: Andreas Wacker (Technische Universität Berlin)
 2000: Eugen Weschke (Freie Universität Berlin)
 1999: Alejandro R. Goni (Technische Universität Berlin)
 1998: Norbert Esser (Technische Universität Berlin)
 1998: Martin Wolf (Fritz-Haber-Institut Berlin)
 1997: Siegfried Bauer (Universität Potsdam)
 1996: Jörg Holland (Physikalische-Technische Bundesanstalt)
 1995: Wolfgang Hübner (Freie Universität Berlin)
 1994: Reinhold Koch (Freie Universität Berlin)
 1993: Christian Borgs (Freie Universität Berlin)
 1992: Eckart Hasselbrink (Fritz-Haber-Institut)
 1991: Michael Farle (Freie Universität Berlin)
 1991: Claus Schneider (Freie Universität Berlin)
 1990: Manfred Pakull (Technische Universität Berlin)
 1989: Mario Prietsch (Freie Universität Berlin)
 1988: Rasit Tepe (Heinrich-Hertz-Institut Berlin)
 1987: Jürgen Gutowski (Technische Universität Berlin)
 1987: Andreas Knauf (Freie Universität Berlin)
 1986: Rainer Sielemann (Hahn-Meitner Institut Berlin)
 1986: Heinrich Metzner (Hahn-Meitner Institut Berlin)
 1985: Johann Schönhense (Fritz-Haber-Institut)
 1984: Friedhelm Lendzian (Freie Universität Berlin)
 1983: Manfred Rosenzweig (Technische Universität Berlin)
 1982: Norbert Ernst (Fritz-Haber-Institut)
 1982: Dietmar Riegel (Freie Universität Berlin)
 1981: Rüdiger Feretti (Technische Universität Berlin)
 1980: Klaus Grützmacher (Physikalische-Technische Bundesanstalt)
 1980: Joachim Seidel (Physikalische-Technische Bundesanstalt)
 1979: Michael Steiner (Hahn-Meitner Institut Berlin)
 1978: Werner Rodewald (Technische Universität Berlin)
 1977: Heinz Deuling (Freie Universität Berlin)
 1977: Dietmar Theis (Technische Universität Berlin)
 1976: Walter Ekardt (Technische Universität Berlin)
 1976: Berndt Kulow (Technische Universität Berlin)
 1975: Gerhard Müller (Technische Universität Berlin)
 1974: Faramaz Mahdjuuri-Sabet (Technische Universität Berlin)
 1974: Nikolaus Stolterfoht (Hahn-Meitner-Institut Berlin)
 1973: Kein Preis vergeben
 1972: Heinrich Homeyer (Hahn-Meitner-Institut Berlin)
 1972: Klaus-Erik Kirchfeld (Technische Universität Berlin)
 1971: Jürgen Andrä (Freie Universität Berlin)
 1971: Burkhard Lischke (Technische Universität Berlin)
 1970: Dietrich Neubert (Physikalische-Technische Bundesanstalt)
 1970: Reinhart Radebold (AEG Berlin)
 1969: Peter Rohner (Technische Universität Berlin)
 1969: Burkhard Wende (Physikalische-Technische Bundesanstalt)
 1968: Gerd Herziger (Technische Universität Berlin)
 1968: Horst Weber (Technische Universität Berlin)
 1967: Dieter Hofmann (Technische Universität Berlin)
 1967: Friedrich Thon (Siemens AG Berlin)
 1966: Jürgen Geiger und Werner Stickel (Technische Universität Berlin)
 1966: Klaus Möbius (Freie Universität Berlin)
 1966: Reinhard Nink (Physikalische-Technische Bundesanstalt)
 1965: Gerd Koppelmann (Technische Universität Berlin)
 1964: Günter Sauerbrey (Technische Universität Berlin)
 1963: Klaus Grohmann (Technische Universität Berlin)
 1962: Wolf-Dieter Riecke (Technische Universität Berlin)
 1961: Gerhard Simonsohn (Freie Universität Berlin)
 1960: Herbert Schirmer (Technische Universität Berlin)
 1959: Hans-Joachim Hamisch (Technische Universität Berlin)
 1959: Arthur Tausend (Technische Universität Berlin)
 1958: Gerhard Hildebrandt (Fritz-Haber-Institut)

See also
 List of physics awards

References

External links
 Die Geschichte des Preises – History of the Karl Scheel Prize
 Die Liste der Preisträger – List of Recipients of the Karl Scheel Prize
 Physikalische Gesellschaft zu Berlin (PGzB) – Physical Society in Berlin

Physics awards
German awards